Clavoserixia is a monotypic beetle genus in the family Cerambycidae described by Stephan von Breuning in 1954. Its single species, Clavoserixia bifasciata, was described by Per Olof Christopher Aurivillius in 1913.

References

Saperdini
Beetles described in 1913
Monotypic Cerambycidae genera